Malkara is a town and district of Tekirdağ Province in the Marmara region of Turkey. It is located at 55 km west of Tekirdağ and 190 km from Istanbul. It covers an area of 1,225 km², which makes the district the largest in Tekirdağ. Population of the town is 25,000 with another 36,000 residing in surrounding villages. The mayor is Ulaş Yurdakul (CHP).

Climate
The district has cold winters, wet winds from the Balkans blow hard across Thrace.

History
Thrace was the scene of fighting during the Persian Wars and the name Malkara is said to come from the Persian 'Margaar' meaning 'cave of snakes'. Alternatively the town may be named after 'Malgar' a general in the army of Alexander the Great who built a fortress here after they had succeeded in bringing to an end the Persian 30-year occupation of Thrace. These fortifications remained in use up until the Byzantine period.

Once the area had been brought under Ottoman control it was settled with Turks from Anatolia and a Turkish town emerged which thrived supplying the Ottoman cavalry regiments. Malkara was then used as a place of exile for those out of favor in the Ottoman court including:

 Hacı Evhat – personal tutor to Suleiman the Magnificent, who exiled Evhat in 1524 when he did not like the lessons
 Koca Sinan Pasha – statesman and Grand Vizier, exiled for four years here after the failure of his campaign against Persia in 1580
 Melek Ahmed Pasha – Grand Vizier, 1650–51
 Boynuyaralı Mehmed Pasha – Grand Vizier, 1656
 Bekri Mustafa Pasha – Grand Vizier, 1688–89

The 17th-century Ottoman traveler Evliya Çelebi described Malkara as a tidy, hard-working town of 150 houses of tiled roofs noted for production of honey, cheese, and leather.

At the end of the 18th century Malkara was the scene of an uprising by the Jannissary troops in protest against plans by Sultan Selim III to replace them with a new model army.

Malkara was occupied by Russian troops in the Russo-Turkish War of 1828-1829, again by the Russians in The Russo-Turkish War of 1877–1878 and most painfully by the Bulgarians for 8.5 months during the Balkan Wars of 1912–1913. In the aftermath of the 1913 Ottoman coup d'état, Malkara was reoccupied by Ottoman troops. 

During World War II, the Greek part of Thrace was occupied by German and Bulgarian troops, and when Turkey was preparing for a possible entry into the war against the Axis powers, refugees from Greece were briefly housed in Malkara for their safety.

Malkara today
Malkara is a small market town serving the countryside around it, which is mostly devoted to growing sunflowers for seeds and oil. There are also one or two coal mines. Many of the people of Malkara originate in the Balkans and are liberal- and secular-minded.

Places of interest
The village of Yenidibek with its reservoir and ruined Byzantine castle is a popular picnic spot.

References

Towns in Turkey
Populated places in Tekirdağ Province
Former_Greek_towns_in_Turkey
Districts of Tekirdağ Province